Saint-Cannat is a commune in the Bouches-du-Rhône department in southern France.

History
The village was named after Canus Natus, a fifth century Roman Catholic Saint, who was a Roman clergyman born with white hair, a quirk synonymous with great wisdom at the time. He was buried in Saint-Cannat, although there was no such place at the time, but soon enough several houses were built into a hamlet.

In the twelfth century, Archbishop Pierre mentioned, 'Castrum Santi - Cannati' in a paper.

In the thirteenth century, villagers turned on their archbishop and pledged allegiance to the Lord of the Baux-de-Provence, and then to the Kings of Sicily (namely, Frederic III of Aragon, or perhaps Louis XIII). This, however, only lasted three years. In the same century, the Knights Templar established a settlement there.

Pierre André de Suffren was born here on 17 July 1729. A century later, Alphonse Tavernier, a poet, was born here on 27 November 1852.

On June 11, 1909, a terrible earthquake destroyed almost everything. Shortly after, the houses were re-built in the same architectural style. Both in 1984 and 1994 huge floods ravaged most houses.

It has retained several fountains dating back to the 17th and 18th century, the remains of the medieval ramparts and the chateau, which today houses the town hall and museum. The Route nationale 7 bisects the village.

There is a polo club, Polo Club de Saint Cannat, opened in the 1970s. It organizes the Open d'Aix and the Tournoi de Noel every year.

There is also an entertainment park called Village des automates.

It is also home to the winery Château de Beaupré, started by Baron Emile Double (1869-1938) in 1890.

The creek Budéou flows through the village.

Population

Gallery

References

External links

 Official website

Communes of Bouches-du-Rhône